Folk music is a genre of music.

Folk music may also refer to: 

Traditional folk music
Contemporary folk music, a wide variety of genres that emerged in the mid 20th century and afterwards
Folk Music (album) by the band Show of Hands
Folk Music (Far East Movement album)